Laurie Tamara Simpson Rivera (born October 26, 1969) is a Puerto Rican model and beauty queen who was crowned Miss International 1987.

Miss International
Prior to winning the beauty pageant, the blonde, blue-eyed beauty participated in several beauty pageants. A native of San Juan, she was a finalist of Miss Puerto Rico in 1986, and was chosen to represent Puerto Rico in the succeeding year when no local pageant took place. She placed 4th Runner-Up at Miss Universe 1987, before going on to win the Miss International 1987 pageant. She was also crowned Nuestra Belleza in 1991.

See also

List of Puerto Ricans

References

External links
Official Miss International website - Past titleholders

1969 births
Living people
Miss International winners
Miss Puerto Rico winners
Miss Universe 1987 contestants
Miss International 1987 delegates
Puerto Rican beauty pageant winners
Puerto Rican female models